The Commission royale d'Histoire (in French) or Koninklijke Commissie voor Geschiedenis (in Dutch) is the Belgian Royal Historical Commission. It was founded by royal decree on 22 July 1834. They initially published their proceedings under the title Compte-rendu des séances de la commission royale d'histoire and since 1845 have published a journal, the Bulletin de la Commission royale d'Histoire / Handelingen van de Koninklijke Commissie voor Geschiedenis.

Members
Victor Coremans was appointed to the Commission in 1836.

References

History organisations based in Belgium
Heritage organizations